Wimbledon Park is the name of an urban park in Wimbledon and also of the suburb south and east of the park and the Wimbledon Park tube station. The All England Lawn Tennis and Croquet Club is immediately to the west of the park. Wimbledon Park is not part of Wimbledon Common, which is situated further to the west up the hill.

Early history 
The original park comprised part of the grounds of Wimbledon manor house, the seat of the manor of Wimbledon, situated on the hill to the south, near St Mary's Church, Wimbledon the old parish church of Wimbledon. A series of owners enlarged the park northwards and eastwards. By the 19th century it was at its largest extent, and one of the homes of the Earls Spencer, lords of the manor. The park had been landscaped in the 18th century by Capability Brown when the lake was formed by constructing a dam across a brook that flows from the springline near Wimbledon Common down to the River Wandle in Earlsfield.

In 1846, the 4th Earl Spencer sold the estate and house to John Augustus Beaumont a property developer who laid out new roads and sold plots of land for house building. Two roads still bear his name today – Augustus Road and Beaumont Road. Development of the area was slow at first, but continued throughout the second half of the 19th century, gradually nibbling away at the parkland.

20th century onwards 
The modern park was purchased by the Borough of Wimbledon just before the First World War and is, with its ornamental lake, the grounds of the Wimbledon Club and Wimbledon Golf Course, the only remnant of the former, larger park. Late in the 20th century the London Borough of Merton sold on the Golf Course to the All England Lawn Tennis and Croquet Club, leaving just the public park and the lake in its ownership.  Along the park's northern edge lies Horse Close wood, a small patch of old planted woodland, largely consisting of Ash and Oak. A Balcony is situated near the entrance at Home Park Road that once served as a tea room before the Second World War. After its closure and abandonment, its windows got vandalised and was boarded up, as showcased in Raymond Briggs's story of his parents who once lived in the area, Ethel and Ernest. The Balcony has since become a Police Station.

Wimbledon Park was added to the English Heritage (now Historic England) register of historic parks and gardens in 1987.

A new children's water play area was opened in 2007, named the Elisabeth Pool in memory of a local child.

The London Underground District line runs to the east of the Park between Southfields tube station and Wimbledon Park station.

Wimbledon Park is home to a wide range of leisure facilities including tennis courts, a bowls pavilion, beach volleyball court and an outdoor and Watersports centre which offer a huge range of activities such as Sailing, Kayaking and Canoeing on the large lake which is park of the park.

The park also contains an athletics stadium with 400m track.

Every November a large fireworks display takes place in Wimbledon Park, organised by Merton Council it is one of the largest and most popular shows in London.

See also

Wimbledon Manor House – For early history of Wimbledon Park and the manor

External links
Save Wimbledon Park
Friends of Wimbledon Park
Wimbledon Park Heritage Group
Wimbledon Park Residents' Association Website
 Wimbledon Park entry from The DiCamillo Companion to British & Irish Country Houses
Wimbledon Park Golf Club
Motco.com
 15 Miles Round London (First edition), J Cary, 1786, Wimbleton
Stanford's 1862 Library Map of London and its Suburbs
Wimbledon Village & west side of Wimbledon Park
East side of Wimbledon Park
  Showing Wimbledon Park House
Wimbledon Park Fireworks
Wimbledon Park Watersports and Outdoor Centre

References

Parks and open spaces in the London Borough of Merton
Districts of the London Borough of Merton
Areas of London
Gardens by Capability Brown
Wimbledon, London
Urban public parks in the United Kingdom